Venrock (portmanteau of Venture and Rockefeller) is a venture capital firm formed in 1969 to build upon the successful investing activities of the Rockefeller family that began in the late 1930s. It has offices in Palo Alto, California, New York City, and Boston, Massachusetts.

History
Venture capitalist Laurance S. Rockefeller (1910–2004) was the fourth of the six children of John D. Rockefeller, Jr. In January 1946 he formed Rockefeller Brothers, Inc., one of the first postwar venture-capital operations, starting with a capitalization of $1.5 million. There were eight partners in all, the five brothers and their sister, Abby, and two non family members Harper Woodward and MIT scientist, Ted Walkowicz. In 1969, the firm became known as Venrock. Laurance S. Rockefeller became an investor in enterprises based on science and technology. His investment interests included the fields of aviation, aerospace, electronics, high temperature physics, composite materials, optics, lasers, data processing, thermionics, and nuclear power.

Venrock closed its seventh fund in July 2014 with 8 partners and its eighth fund in January 2017 with 15 partners, each fund totalling $450 million.

Investments
Venrock invested more than $2.5 billion in more than 440 companies, resulting in 125 initial public offerings. Venrock focuses its investments on early-stage and start-up companies in information technology, healthcare and emerging technologies. These include: Intel, Apple, AppNexus, Astranis, StrataCom, Check Point Software, Dapper Labs, DoubleClick, 3Com Corporation, Mosaic, PGP, Itek, Digex, Interos, Shape Security, Phoenix, Second Rotation (gazelle), RedSeal and CTERA Networks, Juno Therapeutics. It also has a significant venture in the nascent nanotechnology field, with early funding of Nanosys and the nanotech division of Du Pont. Others include BioTime.

In the healthcare sector with partners such as Bryan Roberts, Venrock has invested in athenahealth, Grand Rounds, HealthSouth Corporation, MedPartners, Inc., Castlight Health, Caliper Technologies Corporation, Centocor, Geron, senolytic startup UNITY Biotechnology, Genetics Institute, Idec Pharmaceuticals Corporation, Illumina, Millennium Pharmaceuticals, Sirna Therapeutics, and Sugen.

See also
 Nanotechnology 
 List of venture capital firms

References

Further reading 
 Harr, John Ensor, and Peter J. Johnson. The Rockefeller Century: Three Generations of America's Greatest Family. New York: Charles Scribner's Sons, 1988. 
 Winks, Robin W. Laurance S. Rockefeller: Catalyst for Conservation. New York: Island Press, 1997.

External links 
 Company Website
 "Starting up in Silicon Valley: Long hours, forsaken Lives", The New York Times, February 6, 1984

Financial services companies established in 1969
Companies based in Menlo Park, California
Rockefeller family
Venture capital firms of the United States